Amtosaurus ("Amtgai lizard") is a genus of ornithischian dinosaur based on a fragmentary skull collected from the Upper Cretaceous Bayan Shireh Formation (Cenomanian to Santonian) of Mongolia and originally believed to represent an ankylosaurid. Hadrosaurid affinities have also been suggested. However, per Parish and Barrett, this specimen is too fragmentary to be reliably classified beyond an indeterminate ornithischian. A second species assigned to the genus, A. archibaldi, has become the basis of a valid ankylosaurid taxon, Bissektipelta.

References 

Ornithischian genera
Late Cretaceous dinosaurs of Asia
Cenomanian life
Santonian life
Fossils of Mongolia
Fossil taxa described in 1978
Nomina dubia